The term Eastern Orthodox Patriarch may refer to: 

- any of nine canonical patriarchs of the Eastern Orthodox Church, such as:
 Ecumenical Patriarch of Constantinople
 Greek Orthodox Patriarch of Alexandria
 Greek Orthodox Patriarch of Antioch
 Greek Orthodox Patriarch of Jerusalem
 Russian Orthodox Patriarch
 Serbian Orthodox Patriarch
 Bulgarian Orthodox Patriarch
 Romanian Orthodox Patriarch
 Georgian Orthodox Patriarch

- any of several non-canonical patriarchs within the Eastern Orthodox tradition:
 primate of the Ukrainian Orthodox Church – Kyiv Patriarchate
 primate of the Ukrainian Autocephalous Orthodox Church Canonical
 primate of the Autocephalous Turkish Orthodox Patriarchate

See also
 Oriental Orthodox Patriarch (disambiguation)